Babe Rainbow is an Australian psychedelic rock band from Byron Bay, New South Wales. The band formed in 2014 and they released their first single later that year, Evolution 1964.  The band is noted for their "throw-back" 1960s style of psychedelic rock along with their surf culture imagery. As of 2021, the band has released four full-length albums, along with one EP. The band's later work ventures more into soft rock with influences from latin music, with Domingo being from Venezuela. The band has worked with fellow Flightless alumnus Stu Mackenzie of King Gizzard & the Lizard Wizard to produce their self-titled debut album, The Babe Rainbow. In July 2018, The Babe Rainbow's second studio album, Double Rainbow, debuted at no. 18 on the ARIA Albums Chart.

Discography

Albums
 The Babe Rainbow (2017)
 Double Rainbow (2018)
 Today (2019)
 Changing Colours (2021)
 The Organic Band (2022)

EPs
 The Babe Rainbow EP (2016)

Singles
 Evolution 1964 (2014)
 Aloe Vera (2015)
 Peace Blossom Boogy (2017)
 Losing Something (2017)
 Johny Says Stay Cool (2017)
 Supermoon (2018)
 Morning Song (2019)
 Something New (2019)
 Many Moons of Love (2019)
 Zeitgeist (2020)
 The Wind (2020)
 Your Imagination (2021)
 Ready For Tomorrow (2021)
 Smash the Machine (2021)
 Inner Space (2022)
 All the Power (2022)
 Naxos (2022)

References 

Musical groups established in 2014
New South Wales musical groups
B
2014 establishments in Australia